The Japanese cormorant (Phalacrocorax capillatus), also known as Temminck's cormorant, is a cormorant native to the east Palearctic. It lives from Taiwan, north through Korea and Japan, to the Russian Far East.

The Japanese cormorant has a black body with a white throat and cheeks and a partially yellow bill.

It is one of the species of cormorant that has been domesticated by fishermen in a tradition known in Japan as ukai (鵜飼) (literally meaning 'raising a cormorant'). It is called umiu (ウミウ sea cormorant) in Japanese. The Nagara River's well-known fishing masters work with this particular species to catch ayu.

Footnotes

References

External links
Japanese cormorant  at Avibase

Japanese cormorant
Birds of China
Birds of Japan
Birds of Korea
Birds of Manchuria
Japanese cormorant